Ladislav Mrkvička (2 February 1939 in Prague – 27 December 2020) was a Czech actor. He starred in the film Atentát and in the television series Thirty Cases of Major Zeman, both under director Jiří Sequens. For his performance in the film Old-Timers, he received the Czech Lion 2019 for Best Supporting Actor.

In 1962, he graduated from the Theatre Faculty of the Academy of Performing Arts in Prague. From 1991, he was a member of the National Theatre in Prague. In 2019, he received the Thalia Award for Lifetime Achievement.

Mrkvička died from COVID-19 in 2020.

References

1939 births
2020 deaths
Male actors from Prague
Czech male stage actors
Czech Lion Awards winners
Academy of Performing Arts in Prague alumni
Czech male film actors
Czech male television actors
Recipients of the Thalia Award
Deaths from the COVID-19 pandemic in the Czech Republic